Sherman is an unincorporated community in Grant County, Kentucky, in the United States.

History
A post office called Sherman was established in 1865, and remained in operation until it was discontinued in 1969. In the 1870s, enterprises in Sherman included a store, blacksmith, and school.

Notable person
William Worth Dickerson, Congressman.

References

Unincorporated communities in Grant County, Kentucky
Unincorporated communities in Kentucky